Hălchiu is a commune in Brașov County, Transylvania, Romania. It is composed of two villages, Hălchiu and Satu Nou (Neudorf bei Hopfenseifen; Barcaújfalu).

The commune is located in the east-central part of the county, in the northern part of the Burzenland historical region.

This is the only place in Transylvania and one of the few places in Romania where the grey heron nests in reeds.

Hălchiu is bordered to the north by Feldioara and Crizbav communes, to the east by Bod commune and the city of Brașov, to the south by the town of Ghimbav, and to the west by the city of Codlea and by Dumbrăvița commune.

At the 2011 census, 77.4% of inhabitants were Romanians, 16.4% Hungarians, 4.8% Roma, and 1.4% Germans (more specifically Transylvanian Saxons).

Natives 

 Maria Constantinescu (born 1934), handball player

Sights

References 

Communes in Brașov County
Localities in Transylvania
Burzenland